The 1st Macondo Awards ceremony, presented by the Colombian Academy of Cinematography Arts and Sciences, honored the best audiovisual productions of 2010.  It took place on October 21, 2010, at the Jorge Eliécer Gaitán Theatre in Bogotá. The ceremony awarded 12 categories and was broadcast by Señal Colombia.

The film The Wind Journeys won the award for Best Film.

Winners and nominees

See also

 List of Colombian films
 Macondo Awards
 2010 in film

References

External links
1st Macondo Awards at IMDb
1st Macondo Awards at Filmaffinity

2010 film awards
2010 in Colombia
Events in Bogotá
Culture in Bogotá